Nadezhda Fyodorovna Morozova (born 29 November 1996) is a Russian ice hockey goaltender and member of the Russian national ice hockey team, currently playing in the Zhenskaya Hockey League (ZhHL) with Dinamo-Neva Saint Petersburg.

Career 
Morozova competed with the Russian national team since 2015 and has represented Russia at four IIHF Women's World Championships, in 2016, 2017, 2019, and 2021 (as Russian Olympic Committee), and in the women's ice hockey tournament at the 2018 Winter Olympics, and won gold medals in the women's ice hockey tournaments at the Winter Universiades in 2015, 2017, and 2019.

References

External links
 
 

1996 births
Living people
Russian women's ice hockey goaltenders
Ice hockey people from Moscow
Biryusa Krasnoyarsk players
Ice hockey players at the 2018 Winter Olympics
Olympic ice hockey players of Russia
Universiade medalists in ice hockey
Universiade gold medalists for Russia
Competitors at the 2015 Winter Universiade
Competitors at the 2017 Winter Universiade
Competitors at the 2019 Winter Universiade